The 9th African Swimming Championships were held at Ellis Park, Johannesburg, South Africa from December 1–7, 2008.

Participants
Swimmers from 18 countries competed at the 2008 African Swimming Championships:

Results

Medal standings

Men's events 

|-
|50 m freestyle

|-
|100 m freestyle

|-
|200 m freestyle

|-
|400 m freestyle

|-
|800 m freestyle

|-
|1500 m freestyle

|-
| || || || || ||
|-
|50 m backstroke

|-
|100 m backstroke

|-
|200 m backstroke

|-
| || || || || ||
|-
|50 m breaststroke

|-
|100 m breaststroke

|-
|200 m breaststroke

|-
| || || || || ||
|-
|50 m butterfly

|-
|100 m butterfly

|-
|200 m butterfly
| ||
| ||
| ||
|-
| || || || || ||
|-
|200 m individual medley

|-
|400 m individual medley

|-
| || || || || ||
|-
|4 x 100 m freestyle relay

|-
|4x200m freestyle relay
| ||
| ||
| ||
|-
|4 x 100 m medley relay

|-
| || || || || ||
|-
|5 km open water

Women's events 

|-
|50 m freestyle

|-
|100 m freestyle

|-
|200 m freestyle

|-
|400m freestyle
| ||
| ||
| ||
|-
|800m freestyle
| ||
| ||
| ||
|-
|1500m freestyle
| ||
| ||
| ||
|-
| || || || || || ||
|-
|50 m backstroke

|-
|100 m backstroke

|-
|200m backstroke
| ||
| ||
| ||
|-
| || || || || || ||
|-
|50 m breaststroke

|-
|100 m breaststroke

|-
|200 m breaststroke

|-
| || || || || || ||
|-
|50 m butterfly

|-
|100 m butterfly

|-
|200m butterfly
| ||
| ||
| ||
|-
| || || || || || ||
|-
|200 m individual medley

|-
|400m individual medley
| ||
| ||
| ||
|-
| || || || || || ||
|-
|4 x 100 m freestyle relay

|  Pina Ercolano  Sylvia Brunlehner  Rachita Shah  Achieng Ajulu-Bushell || 4:16.33  NR
|-
|4x200m freestyle relay
| ||
| ||
| ||
|-
|4 x 100 m medley relay

|-
| || || || || || ||
|-
|5 km open water

See also
2008 in swimming

References 

 Full pool results from the CANA website.

External links 
9h African Swimming Championships
Swimming South Africa

African Swimming Championships
African Swimming Championships, 2008
Swimming
Swimming
International aquatics competitions hosted by South Africa
Sports competitions in Johannesburg
Swimming competitions in South Africa
African Swimming Championships
African Swimming Championships, 2008